Jan Grootboom was a Xhosa scout from the Eastern Cape, South Africa who followed and taught Robert Baden-Powell scouting skills during the Matabele campaign.

References

External links
 Google Books preview of 1908 Handbook

Xhosa people